The 2012–13 Ball State Cardinals men's basketball team represented Ball State University during the 2012–13 NCAA Division I men's basketball season. The Cardinals, led by sixth year head coach Billy Taylor, played their home games at the John E. Worthen Arena and were members of the West Division of the Mid-American Conference. They finished the season 15–15, 8–8 in MAC play to finish in third place in the West Division. They lost in the second round of the MAC tournament to Buffalo.

Following the season, head coach Billy Taylor was fired after a record of 84–99 in six seasons.

Roster

Schedule

|-
!colspan=9| Regular season

|-
!colspan=9| 2013 MAC men's basketball tournament

References

Ball State Cardinals men's basketball seasons
Ball State